Paul Andreu (10 July 1938 – 11 October 2018) was a French architect, known for his designs of multiple airports such as Charles de Gaulle Airport in Paris, and multiple prestigious projects in China, including the National Centre for the Performing Arts in Beijing. He also designed an airport terminal in Dubai, that collapsed during construction.

Early life and education 

Andreu was born at Caudéran (Gironde), in southwest France. He graduated in 1958 from the École Polytechnique and continued his studies at the École des ponts ParisTech, graduating in 1961. He next studied under architect Paul Lamarche in the École des Beaux-Arts, graduating in 1968.

Projects 
Andreu was responsible for the design of numerous airports, including Ninoy Aquino International Airport (Manila), Soekarno-Hatta International Airport (Jakarta), Shanghai Pudong International Airport in China, Abu Dhabi International Airport, Dubai International Airport, Cairo International Airport, Brunei International Airport, and the Charles de Gaulle Airport, and Orly Airport in Paris. 

He was in charge of planning and constructing Charles de Gaulle Airport (Roissy) in Paris from 1967 on. On 23 May 2004 a portion of Terminal 2E  collapsed, killing four people. Terminal 2E, inaugurated in 2003, is the seventh terminal at Roissy by Andreu, and has been described as one of Andreu's boldest designs. The collapse was attributed by the ad hoc administrative enquiry commission to a variety of technical causes and the lack of margins of safety in the design. Andreu blamed the collapse on poor execution by the building companies.

Andreu's other projects included the Grande Arche at La Défense in Paris (as associate of Johann Otto von Spreckelsen) and the National Grand Theater of China enclosed in a titanium and glass shell near Beijing's Tiananmen Square which was inaugurated on 22 December 2007.

In 2008, Andreu was hired to design a cultural centre and ticket office in Montreal's new Quartier des Spectacles entertainment district.

Other activities

In 2011, Andreu became dean emeritus and chair professor of the Architecture Department at Zhejiang University in Hangzhou, China, where he taught three months per year. In 2015 and 2016, he was a member of the Prix Versailles judges panel.

References

External links 
www.paul-andreu.com Andreu's homepage 
BBC News: Profile: Paul Andreu
Official report of the enquiry commission 
Pictures and profile at Specifier Magazine
 
 Gerhard Bissell, Andreu, Paul, in: Allgemeines Künstlerlexikon (Artists of the World), Suppl. I, Saur, Munich 2005, from p. 344 (in German).

1938 births
2018 deaths
People from Gironde
Lycée Louis-le-Grand alumni
20th-century French architects
21st-century French architects
French civil engineers
École Polytechnique alumni
École des Ponts ParisTech alumni
Corps des ponts
Commandeurs of the Ordre des Arts et des Lettres
Grand Officers of the Ordre national du Mérite
Officiers of the Légion d'honneur
Members of the Académie des beaux-arts
Academic staff of Zhejiang University